The Gympie Miner was a newspaper published in Gympie, Queensland, Australia. It was also known as The Gympie Miner and One Mile and Monkland Advertiser.

History
The newspaper was published from 1878 to 1899.

References

Gympie Miner
Gympie
1878 establishments in Australia
Publications established in 1878